= Kal Khedi =

Kal Kheda
- village
- Location within Madhya Pradesh Location within India
- Coordinates: 23.186535°N 77.319102°E
- Country: India
- State: Madhya Pradesh
- District: Bhopal
- Tehsil: Huzur

Population (2011)
  - Total: 1,261
- Time zone: UTC+5:30 (IST)
- ISO 3166 code: MP-IN
- Census code: 482513

Kal Khedi is a village in the Bhopal district of Madhya Pradesh, India. It is located in the Huzur tehsil and the Phanda block.

== Demographics ==
According to the 2011 census of India, Kal Khedi has 251 households. The effective literacy rate (i.e. the literacy rate of population excluding children aged 6 and below) is 63.63%.

Demographics (2011 Census)
	Total	Male	Female
Population	1261	640	621
Children aged below 6 years	208	93	115
Scheduled caste	438	221	217
Scheduled tribe	64	37	27
Literates	670	374	296
Workers (all)	472	327	145
Main workers (total)	284	249	35
Main workers: Cultivators	42	41	1
Main workers: Agricultural labourers	17	12	5
Main workers: Household industry workers	7	6	1
Main workers: Other	218	190	28
Marginal workers (total)	188	78	110
Marginal workers: Cultivators	2	1	1
Marginal workers: Agricultural labourers	108	42	66
Marginal workers: Household industry workers	5	1	4
Marginal workers: Others	73	34	39
Non-workers	789	313	476
